Quantum gravity (QG) is a field of theoretical physics that seeks to describe gravity according to the principles of quantum mechanics. It deals with environments in which neither gravitational nor quantum effects can be ignored, such as in the vicinity of black holes or similar compact astrophysical objects, such as neutron stars.

Three of the four fundamental forces of physics are described within the framework of quantum mechanics and quantum field theory. The current understanding of the fourth force, gravity, is based on Albert Einstein's general theory of relativity, which is formulated within the entirely different framework of classical physics. However, that description is incomplete: describing the gravitational field of a black hole in the general theory of relativity leads physical quantities, such as the spacetime curvature, to diverge at the center of the black hole.

This signals the breakdown of the general theory of relativity and the need for a theory that goes beyond general relativity into the quantum realm. At distances very close to the center of the black hole (closer to the Planck length), quantum fluctuations of spacetime are expected to play an important role. To describe these quantum effects a theory of quantum gravity is needed. Such a theory should allow the description to be extended closer to the center and might even allow an  understanding of physics at the center of a black hole. On more formal grounds, one can argue that a classical system cannot consistently be coupled to a quantum one.

The field of quantum gravity is actively developing, and theorists are exploring a variety of approaches to the problem of quantum gravity, the most popular being M-theory and loop quantum gravity. 
All of these approaches aim to describe the quantum behavior of the gravitational field. This does not necessarily include unifying all fundamental interactions into a single mathematical framework. However, many approaches to quantum gravity, such as string theory, try to develop a framework that describes all fundamental forces. Such a theory is often referred to as a theory of everything. Others, such as loop quantum gravity, make no such attempt; instead, they make an effort to quantize the gravitational field while it is kept separate from the other forces.

One of the difficulties of formulating a quantum gravity theory is that direct observation of quantum gravitational effects is thought to only appear at length scales near the Planck scale, around 10−35 meters, a scale far smaller, and hence only accessible with far higher energies, than those currently available in high energy particle accelerators.  Therefore, physicists lack experimental data which could distinguish between the competing theories which have been proposed.

Thought experiment approaches have been suggested as a testing tool for quantum gravity theories. In the field of quantum gravity there are several open questions - e.g., it is not known how spin of elementary particles sources gravity, and thought experiments could provide a pathway to explore possible resolutions to these questions, even in the absence of lab experiments or physical observations.

In the early 21st century, new experiment designs and technologies have arisen which suggest that indirect approaches to testing quantum gravity may be feasible over the next few decades. This field of study is called phenomenological quantum gravity.

Overview 

Much of the difficulty in meshing these theories at all energy scales comes from the different assumptions that these theories make on how the universe works. General relativity models gravity as curvature of spacetime: in the slogan of John Archibald Wheeler, "Spacetime tells matter how to move; matter tells spacetime how to curve." On the other hand, quantum field theory is typically formulated in the flat spacetime used in special relativity. No theory has yet proven successful in describing the general situation where the dynamics of matter, modeled with quantum mechanics, affect the curvature of spacetime. If one attempts to treat gravity as simply another quantum field, the resulting theory is not renormalizable. Even in the simpler case where the curvature of spacetime is fixed a priori, developing quantum field theory becomes more mathematically challenging, and many ideas physicists use in quantum field theory on flat spacetime are no longer applicable.

It is widely hoped that a theory of quantum gravity would allow us to understand problems of very high energy and very small dimensions of space, such as the behavior of black holes, and the origin of the universe.

Quantum mechanics and general relativity

Graviton 

The observation that all fundamental forces except gravity have one or more known messenger particles leads researchers to believe that at least one must exist for gravity. This hypothetical particle is known as the graviton. These particles act as a force particle similar to the photon of the electromagnetic interaction. Under mild assumptions, the structure of general relativity requires them to follow the quantum mechanical description of interacting theoretical spin-2 massless particles.
Many of the accepted notions of a unified theory of physics since the 1970s assume, and to some degree depend upon, the existence of the graviton. 
The Weinberg–Witten theorem places some constraints on theories in which the graviton is a composite particle.
While gravitons are an important theoretical step in a quantum mechanical description of gravity, they are generally believed to be undetectable because they interact too weakly.

Nonrenormalizability of gravity 

General relativity, like electromagnetism, is a classical field theory. One might expect that, as with electromagnetism, the gravitational force should also have a corresponding quantum field theory.

However, gravity is perturbatively nonrenormalizable. For a quantum field theory to be well defined according to this understanding of the subject, it must be asymptotically free or asymptotically safe. The theory must be characterized by a choice of finitely many parameters, which could, in principle, be set by experiment. For example, in quantum electrodynamics these parameters are the charge and mass of the electron, as measured at a particular energy scale.

On the other hand, in quantizing gravity there are, in perturbation theory, infinitely many independent parameters (counterterm coefficients) needed to define the theory. For a given choice of those parameters, one could make sense of the theory, but since it is impossible to conduct infinite experiments to fix the values of every parameter, it has been argued that one does not, in perturbation theory, have a meaningful physical theory. At low energies, the logic of the renormalization group tells us that, despite the unknown choices of these infinitely many parameters, quantum gravity will reduce to the usual Einstein theory of general relativity. On the other hand, if we could probe very high energies where quantum effects take over, then every one of the infinitely many unknown parameters would begin to matter, and we could make no predictions at all.

It is conceivable that, in the correct theory of quantum gravity, the infinitely many unknown parameters will reduce to a finite number that can then be measured. One possibility is that normal perturbation theory is not a reliable guide to the renormalizability of the theory, and that there really is a UV fixed point for gravity. Since this is a question of non-perturbative quantum field theory, finding a reliable answer is difficult, pursued in the asymptotic safety program. Another possibility is that there are new, undiscovered symmetry principles that constrain the parameters and reduce them to a finite set. This is the route taken by string theory, where all of the excitations of the string essentially manifest themselves as new symmetries.

Quantum gravity as an effective field theory 

In an effective field theory, all but the first few of the infinite set of parameters in a nonrenormalizable theory are suppressed by huge energy scales and hence can be neglected when computing low-energy effects. Thus, at least in the low-energy regime, the model is a predictive quantum field theory. Furthermore, many theorists argue that the Standard Model should be regarded as an effective field theory itself, with "nonrenormalizable" interactions suppressed by large energy scales and whose effects have consequently not been observed experimentally.
Works pioneered by Barvinsky and Vilkovisky  suggest as a starting point up to second order in curvature the following action, consisting of local and non-local terms:

where  is an energy scale. The exact values of the coefficients  are unknown, as they depend on the nature of the ultra-violet theory of quantum gravity.   is an operator with the integral representation

By treating general relativity as an effective field theory, one can actually make legitimate predictions for quantum gravity, at least for low-energy phenomena. An example is the well-known calculation of the tiny first-order quantum-mechanical correction to the classical Newtonian gravitational potential between two masses.
Moreover, one can compute the quantum gravitational corrections to classical thermodynamic properties of black holes, most importantly the entropy. A rigorous derivation of the quantum gravitational corrections to the entropy of Schwarzschild black holes was provided by Calmet and Kuipers. A generalisation for charged (Reissner–Nordström) black holes was subsequently carried out by Campos Delgado.

Spacetime background dependence 

A fundamental lesson of general relativity is that there is no fixed spacetime background, as found in Newtonian mechanics and special relativity; the spacetime geometry is dynamic. While simple to grasp in principle, this is a complex idea to understand about general relativity, and its consequences are profound and not fully explored, even at the classical level. To a certain extent, general relativity can be seen to be a relational theory, in which the only physically relevant information is the relationship between different events in space-time.

On the other hand, quantum mechanics has depended since its inception on a fixed background (non-dynamic) structure. In the case of quantum mechanics, it is time that is given and not dynamic, just as in Newtonian classical mechanics. In relativistic quantum field theory, just as in classical field theory, Minkowski spacetime is the fixed background of the theory.

String theory 

String theory can be seen as a generalization of quantum field theory where instead of point particles, string-like objects propagate in a fixed spacetime background, although the interactions among closed strings give rise to space-time in a dynamic way.
Although string theory had its origins in the study of quark confinement and not of quantum gravity, it was soon discovered that the string spectrum contains the graviton, and that "condensation" of certain vibration modes of strings is equivalent to a modification of the original background. In this sense, string perturbation theory exhibits exactly the features one would expect of a perturbation theory that may exhibit a strong dependence on asymptotics (as seen, for example, in the AdS/CFT correspondence) which is a weak form of background dependence.

Background independent theories 
Loop quantum gravity is the fruit of an effort to formulate a background-independent quantum theory.

Topological quantum field theory provided an example of background-independent quantum theory, but with no local degrees of freedom, and only finitely many degrees of freedom globally. This is inadequate to describe gravity in 3+1 dimensions, which has local degrees of freedom according to general relativity. In 2+1 dimensions, however, gravity is a topological field theory, and it has been successfully quantized in several different ways, including spin networks.

Semi-classical quantum gravity 

Quantum field theory on curved (non-Minkowskian) backgrounds, while not a full quantum theory of gravity, has shown many promising early results. In an analogous way to the development of quantum electrodynamics in the early part of the 20th century (when physicists considered quantum mechanics in classical electromagnetic fields), the consideration of quantum field theory on a curved background has led to predictions such as black hole radiation.

Phenomena such as the Unruh effect, in which particles exist in certain accelerating frames but not in stationary ones, do not pose any difficulty when considered on a curved background (the Unruh effect occurs even in flat Minkowskian backgrounds). The vacuum state is the state with the least energy (and may or may not contain particles).

Problem of time 

A conceptual difficulty in combining quantum mechanics with general relativity arises from the contrasting role of time within these two frameworks. In quantum theories time acts as an independent background through which states evolve, with the Hamiltonian operator acting as the generator of infinitesimal translations of quantum states through time. In contrast, general relativity treats time as a dynamical variable which relates directly with matter and moreover requires the Hamiltonian constraint to vanish. Because this variability of time has been observed macroscopically, it removes any possibility of employing a fixed notion of time, similar to the conception of time in quantum theory, at the macroscopic level.

Candidate theories 
There are a number of proposed quantum gravity theories. Currently, there is still no complete and consistent quantum theory of gravity, and the candidate models still need to overcome major formal and conceptual problems. They also face the common problem that, as yet, there is no way to put quantum gravity predictions to experimental tests, although there is hope for this to change as future data from cosmological observations and particle physics experiments become available.

String theory 

The central idea of string theory is to replace the classical concept of a point particle in quantum field theory with a quantum theory of one-dimensional extended objects: string theory. At the energies reached in current experiments, these strings are indistinguishable from point-like particles, but, crucially, different modes of oscillation of one and the same type of fundamental string appear as particles with different (electric and other) charges. In this way, string theory promises to be a unified description of all particles and interactions. The theory is successful in that one mode will always correspond to a graviton, the messenger particle of gravity; however, the price of this success is unusual features such as six extra dimensions of space in addition to the usual three for space and one for time.

In what is called the second superstring revolution, it was conjectured that both string theory and a unification of general relativity and supersymmetry known as supergravity form part of a hypothesized eleven-dimensional model known as M-theory, which would constitute a uniquely defined and consistent theory of quantum gravity. As presently understood, however, string theory admits a very large number (10500 by some estimates) of consistent vacua, comprising the so-called "string landscape". Sorting through this large family of solutions remains a major challenge.

Loop quantum gravity 

Loop quantum gravity seriously considers general relativity's insight that spacetime is a dynamical field and is therefore a quantum object.  Its second idea is that the quantum discreteness that determines the particle-like behavior of other field theories (for instance, the photons of the electromagnetic field) also affects the structure of space.

The main result of loop quantum gravity is the derivation of a granular structure of space at the Planck length.  This is derived from following considerations: In the case of electromagnetism, the quantum operator representing the energy of each frequency of the field has a discrete spectrum. Thus the energy of each frequency is quantized, and the quanta are the photons. In the case of gravity, the operators representing the area and the volume of each surface or space region likewise have discrete spectra. Thus area and volume of any portion of space are also quantized, where the quanta are elementary quanta of space.  It follows, then, that spacetime has an elementary quantum granular structure at the Planck scale, which cuts off the ultraviolet infinities of quantum field theory.

The quantum state of spacetime is described in the theory by means of a mathematical structure called spin networks. Spin networks were initially introduced by Roger Penrose in abstract form, and later shown by Carlo Rovelli and Lee Smolin to derive naturally from a non-perturbative quantization of general relativity.  Spin networks do not represent quantum states of a field in spacetime: they represent directly quantum states of spacetime.

The theory is based on the reformulation of general relativity known as Ashtekar variables, which represent geometric gravity using mathematical analogues of electric and magnetic fields.
In the quantum theory, space is represented by a network structure called a spin network, evolving over time in discrete steps.

The dynamics of the theory is today constructed in several versions. One version starts with the canonical quantization of general relativity.  The  analogue of the Schrödinger equation is a Wheeler–DeWitt equation, which can be defined within the theory.
In the covariant, or spinfoam formulation of the theory, the quantum dynamics is obtained via a sum over discrete versions of spacetime, called spinfoams. These represent histories of spin networks.

Other theories 
There are a number of other approaches to quantum gravity. The theories differ depending on which features of general relativity and quantum theory are accepted unchanged, and which features are modified. Examples include:
 Asymptotic safety in quantum gravity
 Euclidean quantum gravity
 Integral method
 Causal dynamical triangulation
 Causal fermion systems
 Causal Set Theory
 Covariant Feynman path integral approach
 Dilatonic quantum gravity
Double copy theory
 Group field theory
 Wheeler–DeWitt equation
 Geometrodynamics
 Hořava–Lifshitz gravity
 MacDowell–Mansouri action
 Noncommutative geometry
 Path-integral based models of quantum cosmology
 Regge calculus
 Shape Dynamics
 String-nets and quantum graphity
 Supergravity
 Twistor theory
 Canonical quantum gravity

Experimental tests 
As was emphasized above, quantum gravitational effects are extremely weak and therefore difficult to test. For this reason, the possibility of experimentally testing quantum gravity had not received much attention prior to the late 1990s. However, in the past decade, physicists have realized that evidence for quantum gravitational effects can guide the development of the theory. Since theoretical development has been slow, the field of phenomenological quantum gravity, which studies the possibility of experimental tests, has obtained increased attention.

The most widely pursued possibilities for quantum gravity phenomenology include gravitationally mediated entanglement, violations of Lorentz invariance, imprints of quantum gravitational effects in the cosmic microwave background (in particular its polarization), and decoherence induced by fluctuations in the space-time foam.

ESA's INTEGRAL satellite measured polarization of photons of different wavelengths and was able to place a limit in the granularity of space that is less than 10−48 m, or 13 orders of magnitude below the Planck scale.

The BICEP2 experiment detected what was initially thought to be primordial B-mode polarization caused by gravitational waves in the early universe. Had the signal in fact been primordial in origin, it could have been an indication of quantum gravitational effects, but it soon transpired that the polarization was due to interstellar dust interference.

See also 

 De Sitter relativity
 Dilaton
 Doubly special relativity
 Gravitational decoherence
 Gravitomagnetism
 Hawking radiation
 List of quantum gravity researchers
 Orders of magnitude (length)
 Penrose interpretation
 Planck epoch
 Planck units
 Swampland (physics)
 Virtual black hole
 Weak Gravity Conjecture

Notes

References

Further reading

External links 

 "Planck Era" and "Planck Time" (up to 10−43 seconds after birth of Universe) (University of Oregon).
 "Quantum Gravity", BBC Radio 4 discussion with John Gribbin, Lee Smolin and Janna Levin (In Our Time, Feb. 22, 2001)

 
General relativity
Physics beyond the Standard Model
Theories of gravity